The Waterhouse Ministry was a responsible government which held power in New Zealand from October 1872 to March 1873, led by the Hon. George Waterhouse from the Legislative Council. It is notable as the first Ministry to include Māori as members of Cabinet.

Background 
George Waterhouse had previously been Premier of South Australia, and had represented the Fox-Vogel Ministry in the upper house of the New Zealand General Assembly for three weeks in 1871. Julius Vogel won a vote of no confidence against Premier Edward Stafford in October 1872 but the Governor did not call him to form a new government, instead asking William Fox, who in turn advised him to send for Waterhouse due to his status as an ex-Premier and current pastoralist. Waterhouse saw himself as a politically neutral arbiter figure and did not take either a portfolio or a salary, in practice leaving the leadership of the government to Vogel.

Wi Katene and Wiremu Parata were the first indigenous Ministers in New Zealand; Parata called for both races to work together, but his support for the Government caused him some difficulties in Māori circles. Native Minister Donald McLean consulted the Māori Members ahead of the introduction of his Native Lands Act 1873, but only Parata approved.

Although it was regarded as a provincialist ministry, the Waterhouse Government continued Vogel's policy of boosting Public Works and Immigration through debt-funded central government activity. Waterhouse was not aware of the details of Vogel's management of the colonial finances until he filled in as Treasurer while Vogel was overseas; what he learned at this time made him disillusioned as to the sustainability of the borrowing policy, and he decided to resign. John Hall, who was also intending to resign from Cabinet for health reasons, prevailed upon Waterhouse to remain in office to keep the Ministry going. The retiring Governor Bowen also objected to Waterhouse's resignation and refused to accept it - Waterhouse therefore banned him from using the Government's steamer to leave the colony until he did so. Vogel now took his turn as Premier, although Fox took the office until Vogel was able to return from Australia.

Ministers 
The following members served in the Waterhouse Ministry:

See also 

 New Zealand Government

Notes

References 

Ministries of Queen Victoria
Governments of New Zealand
1872 establishments in New Zealand
Cabinets established in 1872
Cabinets disestablished in 1873